This is a list of regions of Bangladesh by Human Development Index as of 2021.

By Division

References 

Bangladesh
Human Development Index
Regions by Human Development Index
Bangladesh